Ruler of the Wasteland is the second studio album by the American heavy metal band Chastain, released in 1986 through Shrapnel Records. During the same year, David T. Chastain released also two other studio albums with his second band CJSS. It is the first album to feature Fifth Angel drummer Ken Mary, who replaced Fred Coury, after a suggestion by Shrapnel Records president and talent scout Mike Varney.

Track listing
All songs by David T. Chastain

Side one
"Ruler of the Wasteland" – 3:46
"One Day to Live" - 4:06
"The King Has the Power"  - 3:03
"Fighting to Stay Alive" - 3:54
"Angel of Mercy" - 5:14

Side two
"There Will Be Justice" - 4:13
"The Battle of Nevermore" - 5:08
"Living in a Dreamworld" - 3:26
"Children of Eden" - 4:21

2008 remastered CD edition bonus tracks
"The Battle of Nevermore" (demo) - 5:48
"Children of Eden" (demo) - 4:55

Personnel

Band members
Leather Leone - vocals
David T. Chastain - guitars, producer
Mike Skimmerhorn - bass
Ken Mary - drums

Production
Steve Fontano - producer, engineer, mixing
Stuart Hirotsu - overdubs engineer
Mike Varney - executive producer

Covers
The Swedish power metal band HammerFall covered the song "Angel of Mercy" on the studio album Crimson Thunder and then on the compilation album of covers Masterpieces

The German band Powergod covered the song "Ruler of the Wasteland" in their album of covers Bleed for the Gods: That's Metal - Lesson I

References

1986 albums
Shrapnel Records albums
Albums produced by Mike Varney
Chastain (band) albums